General elections were held in Costa Rica on 26 July 1953, José Figueres Ferrer of the National Liberation Party won the presidential election, whilst his party also won the parliamentary election. Voter turnout was 67.2 percent in the presidential election and 67.5 percent in the parliamentary election. Local elections were also held.

This was Costa Rica's first election since the end of the 1948 Civil War, and democratic guarantees were not fully restored.

José Figueres, the caudillo of the victorious National Liberation Army faction in the Civil War, was the candidate of the newly founded National Liberation Party (PLN). Liberal Mario Echandi tried to be the candidate from then-ruling National Union Party (PUN), but his candidacy was denied by the Electoral Tribunal due to purported irregularities in the adherents' signatures. This move was highly criticized by Figueres' opponents as an action in favor of Figueres' candidacy.

As PUN was unable to participate, the only other candidacy alternate to Figueres was made by the Democratic Party, which nominated wealthy industrial magnate Fernando Castro Cervantes. The three parties—PLN, PUN and Democratic—were all formerly united in opposition against the 1940s governments of Rafael Angel Calderón and his allies, who were viewed as having caused the civil war. Yet, after the war, such unification ceased.

The losing sides in the civil war, mostly the Republicans (Calderón supporters) and the Communists, were unable to participate as the Republicans' party was disbanded and the Communist Party was constitutionally outlawed. The Republicans were nonetheless allowed to participate in the legislative ballot with a provincial party in San José called the "Independent" Republican Party, and thereby gained some seats. As expected, Figueres won by a landslide victory.

Background

The 1948 Costa Rican general election had resulted in Otilio Ulate Blanco, National Union Party's nominee, winning over former president Rafael Ángel Calderón Guardia and his coalition of the communist People's Vanguard Party and the socialcristiano National Republican Party. The annulment of Ulate's victory led to a civil war that resulted in the overthrow of the calderonista government and the establishing of the "Founding Junta of the Second Republic", led by José Figueres Ferrer. Figueres, a social democrat, reached a deal with Otilio Ulate in which the Junta would govern with all powers (executive, legislative, judicial) for 18 months, introducing a wide array of reformist policies and would convene the election of a Constituent Assembly. In return, the Junta would recognize the legitimacy of Ulate's 1948 victory and would return power to him on no later than November 8, 1949, making him the first president of the "Second Republic" for a period no longer than 4 years.

The Junta constituted itself as a revolutionary government, suspended the 1871 Constitution, with the exception of the individual and social rights. It published several executive degrees with force of law repealing labor rights consecrated in the Labor Code, with the objective of firing  calderonista and communist public employees. Alleging the prevention of any potential rise of militarist tendencies looking to frustrate the consolidation of democracy, the Junta abolished the country's armed forces, keeping only a police force to keep national security. Ever since Costa Rica has had no army. Other policies enacted by the Junta include universal suffrage, allowing women, Afro-descendants and illiterates to vote. The Constituent Assembly of Costa Rica, elected in December, 1948 approved a new Constitution, based on the previous one but with several changes, after the first, more progressive draft was rejected.

The new government agreed to maintain the calderonista social and economic reforms, causing discomfort with oligarchic and conservative sectors. Furthermore, Figueres' decision to nationalize all banks and a 10% wealth tax were controversial and led to a failed coup attempt by Public Security Minister Edgar Cardona Quirós, in what is now known as the :es:Cardonazo.

Results

President

By province

Parliament

By province

By canton

Local governments

Ballot

References

1953 elections in Central America
1953 in Costa Rica
Elections in Costa Rica